Swan is an unincorporated community in Swan Township, Noble County, in the U.S. state of Indiana.

History
Swan was laid out in 1870, and named for its location in Swan Township. A post office was established at Swan in 1838, and remained in operation until 1918.

Geography

References

Unincorporated communities in Noble County, Indiana
Unincorporated communities in Indiana